Decoy receptor 1 (DCR1), also known as TRAIL receptor 3 (TRAILR3) and tumor necrosis factor receptor superfamily member 10C (TNFRSF10C), is a human cell surface receptor of the TNF-receptor superfamily.

Function
The protein encoded by this gene is a member of the TNF-receptor superfamily. This receptor contains an extracellular TRAIL-binding domain and a transmembrane domain, but no cytoplasmic death domain. This receptor is not capable of inducing apoptosis, and is thought to function as an antagonistic receptor that protects cells from TRAIL-induced apoptosis. This gene was found to be a p53-regulated DNA damage-inducible gene. The expression of this gene was detected in many normal tissues but not in most cancer cell lines, which may explain the specific sensitivity of cancer cells to the apoptosis-inducing activity of TRAIL.

References

Further reading

Clusters of differentiation
TNF receptor family